Zik was a French television channel, owned by AB Groupe.

The start 
The channel was originally launched only on AB Sat, in 2000 running from 17:00 to midnight on the German music channel Onyx (owned by AB Sat) which replaced channel 11 on the AB Sat collection, France Courses (now Équidia). The channel was the offshoot of Nostalgie la télé and Musique classique in the musical channels of AB Sat. The programming was different to any previously seen in France. The channel was shown via the Hot Bird satellite and aimed to partner with some of France's biggest clubs. However, success never arrived.

2003 relaunch 
In 2003, AB Sat relaunched the channel in order to show itself as a black music channel. The channel was included in the CanalSat programming. Its audience share was 0.1%.

Return or "bankruptcy" 
In 2005, the marketplace intensified with the arrival of MTV Base, Trace TV, M6 Music Black, and the froup arrived to stop its black music output and become more phone-in oriented. (S.M.S, on-screen chat).

2006 Relaunch 
In June 2006, 'Zik became "The 100% rap channel" and launched its internet site: www.zik.fr

It is available through subscription on all cable operator and digital television networks.

Decision of 'Zik 31 December 2007 
'Zik, the hiphop and rap channel owned by the AB Groupe, ceased broadcast on 31 December 2007. The channel was on air from 7:00 to 22:30 and was shared with the channel XXL. It was replaced by the channel A TV Promo (which aims to sell Bis Télévisions) for an indefinite period.

References

External links

Mediawan Thematics
Defunct television channels in France
Television channels and stations established in 2000
Television channels and stations disestablished in 2007
1998 establishments in France
2007 disestablishments in France